Sergio Ezequiel Unrein (born 16 June 1991) is an Argentine footballer who plays as a striker for Atlántico FC in the Dominican Republic.

Career

Club
In January 2018, Unrein went on trial with Kazakhstan Premier League club Irtysh Pavlodar.

In the same month, he was signed by Pahang FA of Malaysia Super League, but he was released in February after only playing 1 league game with them and replaced by Francis Forkey Doe.

Honours

Club
Boca Juniors
 Primera División Argentina (1): 2011 Apertura

Individual
Top-scorer
 AFA Youth Tournament (5): 2005, 2006, 2007, 2008, 2009
 U-20 Copa Libertadores (1): 2011

References

External links
 Unrein at Football Lineups
 Muy Boca Profile
 Futbol Talentos Profile
 

1991 births
Living people
Argentina international footballers
Argentine footballers
Argentine expatriate footballers
Boca Juniors footballers
Ñublense footballers
Sri Pahang FC players
Juan Aurich footballers
Club Atlético Fénix players
Zulia F.C. players
Ayia Napa FC players
Delfines del Este FC players
Atlántico FC players
Peruvian Primera División players
Primera B Metropolitana players
Venezuelan Primera División players
Primera B de Chile players
Argentine Primera División players
Malaysia Super League players
Cypriot Second Division players
People from Santiago del Estero
Association football forwards
Argentine expatriate sportspeople in Malaysia
Argentine expatriate sportspeople in Chile
Argentine expatriate sportspeople in Peru
Argentine expatriate sportspeople in Cyprus
Argentine expatriate sportspeople in the Dominican Republic
Expatriate footballers in Malaysia
Expatriate footballers in Chile
Expatriate footballers in Peru
Expatriate footballers in Cyprus
Expatriate footballers in the Dominican Republic
Sportspeople from Santiago del Estero Province